Aloe jawiyon is a species of plant in the genus Aloe. It is endemic to the island of Socotra, Yemen.

Distribution and habitat
It is one of three Aloe species that naturally occur on Socotra, the other two being Aloe perryi and Aloe squarrosa. Its natural habitat is dry, rocky slopes and limestone at higher altitude.

Description
The leaves are curved, canaliculate and a creamy, greenish-yellow khaki colour. The inflorescence is short, unbranching, and starts out horizontal. The flowers are orange with green tips.

References

 

jawiyon
Near threatened plants
Endemic flora of Socotra
Taxonomy articles created by Polbot